Charles Edward Cook Jr. (born November 20, 1953) is an American political analyst who specializes in election forecasts and political trends.

Cook writes election forecasts and rankings in the publication he founded, The Cook Political Report with Amy Walter, and in other media. He is a political analyst for the National Journal and since 1994 with NBC. Cook writes two columns for National Journal, "The Cook Report" for the main publication and "Off to the Races" for the online National Journal Congress Daily.  Since the 1984 US presidential election, Cook has provided election night commentary for various television networks.

Career
Cook graduated in 1972 from Captain Shreve High School in Shreveport and attended Georgetown University in Washington, DC.

Cook worked on Capitol Hill for then-Senator J. Bennett Johnston, a Democrat from Shreveport who served from 1972 to 1997. Cook also worked for the Democratic Senatorial Campaign Committee and the Democratic Policy Committee. In addition, he worked as a pollster and campaign consultant and on the staff of BUILD-PAC, the political action committee of the trade association, the National Association of Home Builders.

In 1984, he founded the newsletter The Cook Political Report, which publishes analyses of the primaries and general elections for federal political offices and state governorships.  The Report's predictions are accorded high credibility among journalists and politicians.

In 2006, Cook was inducted into the Louisiana Political Museum and Hall of Fame in Winnfield.

In 2010, he won the Carey McWilliams award from the American Political Science Association. The award is given annually to honor a major journalistic contribution to our understanding of politics and carries a prize of $750.

In 2013, he served as a Resident Fellow at the Harvard Institute of Politics.

In 2021, Amy Walter took over Cook's roles as Editor and Publisher of the since-renamed Cook Political Report with Amy Walter. He will continue to write columns and analysis for the newsletter as well as for National Journal.

Family life
Cook is the son of Mary Hudgens Cook and Charles Cook Sr. (Magnolia, Arkansas 1916–2012). His father was a highly decorated officer in the United States Army Air Forces during World War II, and an electrical engineering graduate from the University of Arkansas.

Cook and his wife Lucy live in Chevy Chase, Maryland. He has two sisters, Carole  and Margaret, and a brother, Robert.

Notes

External links
 (Weekly Column)

1953 births
American male journalists
Living people
People from Shreveport, Louisiana
Georgetown University alumni
Captain Shreve High School alumni
Journalists from Washington, D.C.
Harvard Institute of Politics
Pollsters
The Cook Political Report with Amy Walter people